Tom Barber may refer to:

Tom Barber (cricketer) (born 1995), English cricketer
Tom Barber (golfer) (1894–1936),English professional golfer
Tom Barber (Big Brother) (born 1996), English Big Brother contestant
Tom Barber (artist), cover artist for Weird Tales
Tom Barber (musician), former lead singer for deathcore band, Lorna Shore.

See also
 Thomas Barber (disambiguation)